This is a list of the NCAA outdoor champions in the 2 mile run until the event was terminated in 1958 in favor of the 5000 meters.  Starting in 1936, the event was substituted for the 5000 meters Olympic distance.  Hand timing was used throughout the duration of this event.

Champions
Key
y=yards
A=Altitude affected

References

GBR Athletics

External links
NCAA Division I men's outdoor track and field

NCAA Men's Division I Outdoor Track and Field Championships - Men's A
Outdoor track, men
Two miles